Áed Balb mac Indrechtaig (died 742) was a King of Connacht from the Uí Briúin branch of the Connachta. He was the son of Indrechtach mac Muiredaig Muillethan (died 723), a previous king. He was of the Síl Muiredaig sept of the Uí Briúin. His sobriquet Balb means "Stammerer".

Aed is mentioned as king in both the king-lists and the annals. He ruled from 735 to 742, but nothing is known of his reign.

Notes

See also
Kings of Connacht

References

 Annals of Tigernach
 Annals of Ulster
 Francis J.Byrne, Irish Kings and High-Kings
 Laud Synchronisms
 The Chronology of the Irish Annals, Daniel P. McCarthy

External links
CELT: Corpus of Electronic Texts at University College Cork

742 deaths
Kings of Connacht
People from County Roscommon
8th-century Irish monarchs
Year of birth unknown